Elena Dementieva was the defending champion, but she was defeated in the quarterfinals by Maria Sharapova.

Ana Ivanovic won in the final 7–5, 6–4, against Nadia Petrova, despite being two match points down in the third set of the semifinals against Jelena Janković. It was her second title of the year and her fourth overall.

Seeds
The top eight seeds received a bye into the second round.

Draw

Finals

Top half

Section 1

Section 2

Bottom half

Section 3

Section 4

References

External links
Draw and Qualifying Draw

LA Women's Tennis Championships
East West Bank Classic
East West Bank Classic - Singles